Heteragrion eboratum is a species of damselfly in the family Heteragrionidae. It is found in Guatemala, Honduras, and Nicaragua. Its natural habitats are subtropical or tropical moist montane forests and rivers. It is threatened by habitat loss.

References

Insects described in 1965
Taxonomy articles created by Polbot